The Jerky Boys is the self-titled debut comedy album by prank call artists, the Jerky Boys. The album was released in 1993 by Atlantic Records' subsidiary Select Records, which was formerly an independent New York City-based label previously known for releasing rap music.

The album was received well by critics and the public alike, eventually reaching platinum sales certification by the Recording Industry Association of America.

Track listing
 "Irate Tile Man"
 "Unemployed Painter"
 "Laser Surgery"
 "Insulator Job"
 "Egyptian Magician"
 "Sol's Glasses"
 "Car Salesman"
 "Sushi Chef"
 "Super Across The Way"
 "The Gay Model"
 "The Home Wrecker"
 "Auto Mechanic"
 "Dental Malpractice"
 "Starter Motor Repair"
 "Hurt At Work"
 "Hot Rod Mover"
 "Firecracker Mishap"
 "Punitive Damages"
 "Piano Tuner"
 "Gay Hard Hat"
 "Uncle Freddie"

References

External Links 

 

1993 debut albums
The Jerky Boys albums
1990s comedy albums
Select Records albums